Auf der Maur is a surname. Notable people with the surname include:

Melissa Auf der Maur (born 1972), Canadian rock musician
Auf der Maur (album), debut album of Melissa Auf der Maur
Nick Auf der Maur (1942–1998), Canadian journalist and politician

See also
 Maur (disambiguation)

German-language surnames